Michal Mertiňák (born 11 October 1979) is a retired professional tennis player from Slovakia. He turned professional in 1999, and has won six doubles titles in his career on the ATP Tour. He reached his career high doubles ranking of World No. 12 in February 2010. He played in the 2005 Davis Cup for Slovakia, who finished runner-up to Croatia. Mertiňák played two ties in the final, including losing the deciding fifth rubber to Mario Ančić.

From 2009 until 2010 his doubles partner was Czech František Čermák. He has won five tournaments with him in the 2009 season. Now he partners up with André Sá.

Performance timelines

Singles

Doubles

Mixed doubles

ATP career finals

Doubles: 23 (13 titles, 10 runner-ups)

ATP Challenger and ITF Futures finals

Singles: 14 (6–8)

Doubles: 41 (19–22)

External links
 
 
 

1979 births
Living people
Sportspeople from Považská Bystrica
Slovak male tennis players